Casuso is a surname. Notable people with the surname include:

Roberto Casuso (1954–2011), Cuban handball player
Teresa Casuso Morín (1912–1994), Cuban intellectual

See also
Caruso (surname)